is a fictional character in Koyoharu Gotouge's manga series Demon Slayer: Kimetsu no Yaiba. Nezuko and her older brother Tanjiro Kamado are the sole survivors of an incident where they lost their entire family to demons, with Nezuko being transformed into a demon, but still surprisingly showing signs of human emotion and thought. After an encounter with Giyu Tomioka, a demon slayer, Tanjiro begins his quest to help his sister turn into human again and avenge the death of his family.

Nezuko's character was created to make Tanjiro a more innovative character due to her identity being of a demon. Initial critical response to Nezuko was positive due to how unconventional it was for the narrative to have her kind of character as a demon as well as how she displays more powers to fight across the series.

She has also been a popular character within the Demon Slayer fanbase, appearing in an issue from the Weekly Playboy magazine.

Creation and development

Nezuko's character was created by mangaka Koyoharu Gotouge to make the lead Tanjiro Kamado be more unique. Due to Nezuko being a demon, Tanjiro cannot bring himself to hate the demons he faces and instead finds himself in a gray zone of black and white morality. The author's editor and other assistants said that thanks to this, the manga took a more innovative narrative that easily engaged the readers. 

Anime producer Yuma Takahashi said that while Nezuko is silent ever since the first episode, the staff could express intricate changes in the character's facial expression and humanize her emotions. Through those advantages, they were able to give more depth to her. Takahashi claimed that he wanted viewers to look forward to the development of Nezuko and the wide range of emotions she could show. The anime uses an insert theme song titled "Kamado Tanjiro no Uta". It expresses the determination of Tanjiro, who stands up from despair and struggles to protect his younger sister.

Akari Kitō, the Japanese voice actor of Nezuko, said Tanjiro's voice actor, Natsuki Hanae, is like a big brother to her at the studio as he is supportive and if there are parts that she has difficulty recording, Hanae would stay and wait till she finishes even though he has done his part. Hanae said he also thinks of Kitō as a younger sister. For the English dub, Abby Trott described Nezuko as "a sweet, caring sister to her many siblings," even when she becomes a demon as she often aids her brother in battles. This kindness displayed by Nezuko was found relatable by Trott.

Appearances
Nezuko is the daughter of Tanjuro Kamado and Tanjiro's younger sister who is turned into a demon. Despite Muzan Kibutsuji assumption that he has killed them all in his attempt to sire a sun-resistant demon, Nezuko survives as a demon with her mind mostly gone. However, she retains enough of her memories to keep herself from killing Tanjiro. Due to two years of hypnotic conditioning by Urokodaki, Nezuko regards all humans as her family and will mercilessly attack any demon that threatens them. Instead of consuming human flesh, Nezuko regains energy from sleep and tends to become unconscious for long periods of time after overexerting herself. Initially, she is unable to speak and must wear a bamboo gag to keep from biting anyone. However, in later volumes, the muzzle is removed and she gains the power of speech in volume 22 then remembers everything and gets her human thoughts again and remembers her name, albeit very broken due to not speaking for more than two years. Nezuko has several powers, including regeneration, superhuman strength, growing and shrinking rapidly and a blood demon technique called  that causes her blood to burn once it leaves her body. Tanjiro generally carries her around in a wooden box (a gift from Urokodaki) until she develops the ability to survive exposure to sunlight, with Muzan targeting her soon after. Nezuko's mind and humanity are eventually restored during the final battle against Muzan, and it is implied that she helps Tanjiro recover from his demon transformation by allowing him to ingest her blood, which contains antibodies for Muzan's demonic blood.

The character also makes an appearance in the video game Demon Slayer: Kimetsu no Yaiba – The Hinokami Chronicles.

Reception
Early response to Nezuko was positive. Rebecca Silverman from Anime News Network noted that Nezuko retained her humanity despite becoming a demon due to how she protects her older brother which makes Giyu allow the siblings to embark on a quest to find a cure to her state. James Beckett from the same site said that Nezuko's transformation into a demon was the pilot's strongest part which makes the narrative surprisingly unconventional, based on Tanjiro's reaction to it and Giyu's actions. Manga.Tokyo also praised the development of Nezuko's actions because she manages to awake after two years as a caring demon to Tanjiro which makes their embracing emotional. Comic Book Bin enjoyed Nezuko's portrayal as, while being a cursed character, she is still active and appealing to see, mostly due to how she develops supernatural strength to use in combat. In a general overview of the series' first episodes, UK Anime News found Nezuko as the most compelling character for the depth she possesses and, like Comic Book Bin, noted she is surprisingly helpful to Tanjiro when it comes to fighting. Comic Book Resources regarded the duo as "the most likable male and female leads of the decade". UK Anime News also liked how the two siblings are compared to the villains in a meaningful way. Anime Inferno said, "Tanjiro and Nezuko make a great team and are two enjoyable protagonists, with the series at its best when the two siblings are working together."

In February 2020 at Crunchyroll Anime Awards, the fight of Tanjiro and his sister Nezuko against Rui won the "Best Fight Scene" category. The 19th episode of the first season, "Hinokami", was cited by critics at IGN as one of television's best episodes in history, commenting on the build-up and exciting execution. Manga.Tokyo enjoyed the build-up of this scene as Nezuko manages to assist Tanjiro thanks to being motivated by her late mother and the power she shows surprised the writer. Due to the emotional delivery of this scene, the writer looked forward to more interactions between the two siblings. Anime News Network was surprised by Nezuko's heroic actions in the episode as well as the voice acting from Akari Kitō despite not having multiple lines in the series, being able to develop her character in the process. The character's handling in the Entertainment District Arc was panned by Anime News Network for giving her sexualization despite her young age.

She was ranked in 3rd place in the first Demon Slayer character popularity poll with 3,319 votes. IGN regarded Nezuko as one of the series's most popular characters and noted how her design elaborates the way she sees humans as good people as a result of hypnosis. Siliconera made a similar article discussing her characterization and how compelling she is during the anime's first season due to how, despite her tragic backstory, Nezuko becomes a more heroic figure when fighting other demons. In 2021, Nezuko appeared on the cover of the July issue of Weekly Playboy featuring an interview with Kitō. In October 2021, Shueisha failed its appeal to trademark the clothing patterns for three of Demon Slayer main characters including Nezuko. She won the Newtype "Best Female Character" award for her role in the series.

As a result, the internet has exploded with various cosplayers dressing up as Nezuko on TikTok; and Instagram. Many websites have also started creating content on how to do a Nezuko cosplay. Even graphic designers and illustrators have taken to Pinterest; with their own fan art and interpretations of Nezuko.

References

External links
  

Anime and manga characters who can move at superhuman speeds
Anime and manga characters with accelerated healing
Anime and manga characters with superhuman strength
Comics characters introduced in 2016
Demon Slayer: Kimetsu no Yaiba
Female characters in anime and manga
Female soldier and warrior characters in anime and manga
Fictional characters who can change size
Fictional characters with fire or heat abilities
Fictional characters with immortality
Fictional characters with slowed ageing
Fictional characters with superhuman durability or invulnerability
Fictional characters with superhuman senses
Fictional characters with post-traumatic stress disorder
Fictional demon hunters
Fictional demons and devils
Fictional female martial artists
Fictional Japanese people in anime and manga
Fictional mercenaries in comics
Fictional yōkai
Martial artist characters in anime and manga
Orphan characters in anime and manga
Teenage characters in anime and manga